Senen Reyes (born November 22, 1965), also known by his stage name Sen Dog, is a Cuban-American rapper and musician who is best known as a member of the rap group Cypress Hill and as the lead vocalist for the heavy metal band Powerflo. He has been developing a solo career in addition to his work with Cypress Hill and Powerflo, and is the lead vocalist for rap rock band SX-10.

Career 
Sen Dog is a member of the rap group Cypress Hill, with whom he has had multiple albums in the Top 10 on the Billboard 200 album chart (including the No. 1 album Black Sunday). Some of the most well-known songs that he performs with Cypress Hill are "How I Could Just Kill a Man", "(Rap/Rock) Superstar" and "Insane in the Brain".

In the late 1990s, Sen Dog took a leave of absence from Cypress Hill to develop a new rock/rap band called SX-10. He wanted the band to have a funk sound with Latin influences. SX-10 released an album in 2000 called Mad Dog American. In 1996, he performed "Quien Es Ese Negro (Who's That Black Dude)" with Mellow Man Ace, MC Skeey, Mr. Rico, and DJ Rif for the AIDS benefit album, Silencio=Muerte: Red Hot + Latin, produced by the Red Hot Organization.

On September 30, 2008, Sen Dog released his first solo album, Diary of a Mad Dog, seventeen years after the release of the first Cypress Hill album. In an interview with HipHopDX, Sen Dog described how he felt that he had more control and could talk about personal aspects of his life with this album. He said, "With Cypress, I never really felt that comfortable to put personal aspects of my life into the music. It feels good to have the opportunity to be the quarterback, if you want to call it that, in the studio, and be creative. I definitely found that I had more in me than I thought I did." He said that he wanted to have fun with this album and that he has tried out a lot of different types of music but had no agenda for the type of music on Diary of a Mad Dog. "We've done the whole dark, morbid thing. The rock n' roll crossover; just a lot of things. I'm not going to have an agenda on this; I'm going to jam and record whatever is fun to me."

Personal life 
In the 1980s, Sen Dog was affiliated with a Bloods gang set known as "Neighborhood Family", and later introduced B-Real into the set before B-Real was shot in the lung in 1988. Sen Dog is known to be an avid marijuana smoker and Cypress Hill has made songs about the use of marijuana, including "Legalize it", "I Wanna Get High" and "Hits from the Bong". Sen Dog and B-Real were childhood friends and Sen Dog gave B-Real his first joint when Sen Dog was 17 years old. In an interview with Entertainment Weekly Sen Dog said, "Pot got a bad name with the flower children of the '60s, and then all these hard drugs came in, and people started dropping like flies. Today, people want to get high on something that's not going to give them a heart attack, like speed or crack."

Reyes and former Slayer drummer Dave Lombardo are childhood friends who attended the same high school.

He is the older brother of Mellow Man Ace (born Ulpiano Sergio Reyes).

Discography

Solo 
Diary of a Mad Dog (2008)

With Cypress Hill 
 Cypress Hill (1991)
 Black Sunday (1993)
 III: Temples of Boom (1995)
 IV (1998)
 Skull & Bones (2000)
 Stoned Raiders (2001)
 Till Death Do Us Part (2004)
 Rise Up (2010)
 Cypress x Rusko (2012)
 Elephants on Acid (2018)
 Back in Black (2022)

With SX-10 
Mad Dog American (2000)
Temple of Tolerance (Unreleased) (2006)
EP (2008)

With The Reyes Brothers 
 Ghetto Therapy (2006)

With Powerflo 
 Powerflo (2017)
Bring That Shit Back! (2018)

Guest appearances

Mixtapes 
Collabo Killa (2000)
Fat Joints Volume 1 (2007)

See also 
List of Cuban Americans
Afro-Latin Americans

References

External links 
Official Cypress Hill website

1965 births
Living people
People from Havana
Cuban people of African descent
American male rappers
American heavy metal singers
American people of Cuban descent
Bloods
Cypress Hill members
Hispanic and Latino American rappers
Rap rock musicians
Rappers from Los Angeles
Gangsta rappers
Nu metal singers
21st-century American rappers
Powerflo members